Way may refer to:

Paths
 a road, route, path or pathway, including long-distance paths
 a straight rail or track on a machine tool (such as that on the bed of a lathe) on which part of the machine slides
 Ways, large slipway in shipbuilding, the ramps down which a ship is pushed in order to be launched
 Way (vessel), a ship's speed or momentum

Religion
"The Way", New Testament term for Christianity
Tao (Chinese: "The Way" 道), a philosophical concept (cf. Taoism)
 Way, plural Wayob, spirit companions appearing in mythology and folklore of Maya peoples of the Yucatán Peninsula

Places
 Lake Way, a dry lake in Western Australia
 Way, Mississippi
 Way, St Giles in the Wood, historic estate in St Giles in the Wood, Devon

Music
WAY-FM Network, a network of Christian music radio stations in the USA
WAY FM (Michigan), the tradename of a group of radio stations owned by Cornerstone University in Grand Rapids, Michigan
Ways (album), by Japanese rock band Show-Ya
"Ways", 1968 single by The Candymen
"Ways", 2018 song by Smokepurpp from Bless Yo Trap
"Ways", 2019 song by Third Eye Blind from Screamer

Other uses
Way (surname)
Way (machine tool element)

See also
 The Way (disambiguation)
 WAYS (disambiguation)
 Wey (disambiguation)
 Whey (disambiguation)
 Wei (disambiguation)